Eliana María Krawczyk (5 March 1982 – 15 November 2017) was an officer of the Argentine Navy. She was among the 44 crew members of the Argentine submarine ARA San Juan when it sank on 15 November 2017.

Early life and education
Eliana María Krawczyk was born on 5 March 1982 in Oberá, Misiones Province, Argentina, to two Jewish Polish immigrants. She entered primary school at age five.

Career
In 2003, while studying industrial engineering in her hometown, Krawczyk learned through an internet advertisement that the Argentine Navy was recruiting women. She traveled to Posadas, Misiones to enlist that year and was enrolled at the  the next year. She graduated in 2008 and was assigned to the ARA Libertad for training. It was here that she became interested in submarines. Once her eight-month training period had elapsed, she signed up for submarine training in Mar del Plata.

Krawczyk went to submarine school in 2012 and graduated at the top of her class. She was assigned first to the ARA Salta, remaining there for four years. This posting made Krawczyk the first female submariner in Latin America. In 2016, she transferred to ARA San Juan.

On 8 October 2015, the Argentine Navy promoted Krawczyk to the rank of Frigate lieutenant, making her the Navy's first female submarine officer.

She was promoted again, to Lieutenant, by decree of the Argentine government on 17 March 2017.

Disappearance of ARA San Juan

On 17 November 2017, ARA San Juan disappeared off the San Jorge Gulf while sailing to Mar del Plata after a military exercise. Krawczyk was among the 44 crew members aboard ARA San Juan when it disappeared and, when the submarine was not located within a week, she and the rest of the crew were presumed dead by the Argentine government. The submarine's wreckage was found a year later  underwater,  from the San Jorge Gulf. At the time of the submarine's loss, Krawczyk was its third highest-ranking officer and the only woman aboard. Krawczyk's sister joined the search parties, but left 10 days before the discovery of the wreck.

Legacy
To honor Krawczyk's memory, the city of Oberá announced 27 days after ARA San Juans disappearance that it would name a street after her. Argentina's Jewish community honored Krawczyk on International Women's Day, 9 March 2018, in a ceremony at the Alvear Hotel in Buenos Aires. 500 guests attended the event, including Rabbi Alejandro Avruj and politicians Carolina Stanley and Patricia Bullrich.

Citations

1982 births
2010s missing person cases
2017 deaths
Argentine Navy officers
Argentine people of Polish-Jewish descent
Missing person cases in Argentina
People from Oberá
People who died at sea